Amie Miriello is an American singer-songwriter and guitarist whose eclectic sound can be categorized as indy folk/rock.. She was the lead singer of the rock band Dirtie Blonde from 2005 through 2007. Miriello was also a founding member of the group SO & SO.She is currently a solo artist and songwriter whose songs have been heard on TV shows and in nationally televised commercials.

In 2008, Miriello's first solo album, I Came Around, was released on Jive Records Bellasonic label. Singer-songwriter and American Idol judge Kara DioGuardi co-wrote some of the songs on the album.

In 2019 she joined with Vanessa Olivarez to form the Americana duo, Boys Club For Girls. On January 27, 2020, they released a video for the song "The Weatherman" off their album expected to release later in the year.

See also

 List of female rock singers
 List of folk-rock artists
 List of guitarists by genre
 List of singer-songwriters

References

External links 

 
 
 Anitai, Tamar (May 29, 2009).  "New Video: Amie Miriello, 'Brand New'".  MTV Buzzworthy Blog (blog of MTV Buzzworthy).  Retrieved January 1, 2013.
 Bacher, Danielle (September 8, 2011).  "So & So Viper Room 9/7/11".   Music Blog (blog of the LA Weekly).  Retrieved January 1, 2013.

Year of birth missing (living people)
Place of birth missing (living people)
20th-century births
21st-century American singers
American women singer-songwriters
American singer-songwriters
American folk guitarists
American folk singers
American rock songwriters
American rock guitarists
American women rock singers
Grammy Award winners
Living people
21st-century American guitarists
20th-century American guitarists
21st-century American women singers
20th-century American women guitarists
21st-century American women guitarists